Gábor Jánvári (born 25 April 1990) is a Hungarian football player who plays for Nyíregyháza.

Club statistics

Updated to games played as of 30 September 2018.

References

External links
 Player profile at HLSZ 
 

1990 births
Living people
People from Kisvárda
Hungarian footballers
Association football defenders
Kaposvári Rákóczi FC players
Kisvárda FC players
Nyíregyháza Spartacus FC players
Szombathelyi Haladás footballers
BFC Siófok players
Nemzeti Bajnokság I players
Nemzeti Bajnokság II players
Sportspeople from Szabolcs-Szatmár-Bereg County
21st-century Hungarian people